Pseudoperomyia is a genus of midges in the family Cecidomyiidae. The 29 described species are found in the Palearctic and the Indomalayan regions. The genus was first described by Mathias Jaschhof and Heikki Hippa in 1999.

Species

Pseudoperomyia acutistyla Jaschhof & Hippa, 1999
Pseudoperomyia bidentata Jaschhof & Hippa, 1999
Pseudoperomyia bispinata Jaschhof & Hippa, 1999
Pseudoperomyia bryomyoides Jaschhof & Hippa, 1999
Pseudoperomyia composita Jaschhof, 2000
Pseudoperomyia fagiphila Jaschhof, 2000
Pseudoperomyia furcillata Jaschhof, 2000
Pseudoperomyia gemina Jaschhof & Hippa, 1999
Pseudoperomyia hondoensis Jaschhof, 2000
Pseudoperomyia humilis Jaschhof & Hippa, 1999
Pseudoperomyia intermedia Jaschhof & Hippa, 1999
Pseudoperomyia japonica Jaschhof, 2000
Pseudoperomyia labellata Jaschhof & Hippa, 1999
Pseudoperomyia longicornis Jaschhof & Hippa, 1999
Pseudoperomyia longidentata Jaschhof & Hippa, 1999
Pseudoperomyia macrostyla Jaschhof & Hippa, 1999
Pseudoperomyia obtecta Jaschhof & Hippa, 1999
Pseudoperomyia obtusidentata Jaschhof & Hippa, 1999
Pseudoperomyia oculibunda Jaschhof & Hippa, 1999
Pseudoperomyia orophila Jaschhof & Hippa, 1999
Pseudoperomyia parvolobata Jaschhof & Hippa, 1999
Pseudoperomyia platystyla Jaschhof & Hippa, 1999
Pseudoperomyia polyardioides Jaschhof & Hippa, 1999
Pseudoperomyia psittacephala Li & Bu, 2001
Pseudoperomyia pyramidata Jaschhof & Hippa, 1999
Pseudoperomyia trispinata Jaschhof & Hippa, 1999
Pseudoperomyia variabilis Jaschhof & Hippa, 1999
Pseudoperomyia velata Jaschhof, 2000
Pseudoperomyia ventricosa Jaschhof & Hippa, 1999

References

Cecidomyiidae genera

Insects described in 1999
Taxa named by Mathias Jaschhof
Taxa named by Heikki Hippa